The 2007 Nigerian Senate election in Ondo State was held on 21 April 2007, to elect members of the Nigerian Senate to represent Ondo State. Gbenga Ogunniya representing Ondo Central, Bode Olajumoke representing Ondo North and Hosea Ehinlanwo representing Ondo South all won on the platform of the Peoples Democratic Party.

Overview

Summary

Results

Ondo Central 
The election was won by Gbenga Ogunniya of the Peoples Democratic Party.

Ondo North 
The election was won by Bode Olajumoke of the Peoples Democratic Party.

Ondo South 
The election was won by Hosea Ehinlanwo of the Peoples Democratic Party.

References 

April 2007 events in Nigeria
Ondo State Senate elections
Ond